The Regional State Archives in Bergen is a regional state archives situated at Årstad in Bergen, Norway. Part of the National Archival Services of Norway, it is responsible for archiving documents from state institutions in the counties of Hordaland and Sogn og Fjordane. The collection includes 15 shelf-kilometers of material.

The office was established in 1885, as the second regional state archive in Norway. Originally situated at Klosteret 17, the archives moved to their current location in 1921. Documents from Sunnmøre were stored in Bergen until about 1930, after which they were moved to the Regional State Archives in Trondheim. Until the 1949 establishment of the Regional State Archives in Stavanger, the Bergen division was also responsible for documents from Rogaland. The Rogaland office remained administratively subordinate to Bergen until 1970. Expansions to the building were built in 1975 and 1992.

References

National Archival Services of Norway
Organisations based in Bergen
1885 establishments in Norway
Government agencies established in 1885